FSV Wacker 90 Nordhausen is a German association football club from Nordhausen, Thuringia.

The club's greatest success has been promotion to the Regionalliga Nordost in 1995 and 2013. It has also won the Thuringia Cup on three occasions and, through this, qualified for the first round of the DFB-Pokal, the German Cup.



History

The football team FC Wacker 05 Nordhausen was founded on 1 November 1905 as an offshoot of a Protestant youth club in the city. By 14 June 1906 the team had broadened its scope to become the sports club SV Wacker 05 Nordhausen  and in 1908 merged with local side Ballsport-Club Mars Nordhausen which had been formed in 1906. Until 1918 the club played as SV Wacker-Mars Nordhausen when it was renamed 1. SV Wacker 05 Nordhausen. Playing in the VMBV (Verband Mitteldeutscher Ballspiel Vereine or Federation of Middle German Ball Playing Teams), Wacker participated in the early rounds of the league championships in the mid- to late 20s, but without any success.

After the end of World War II occupying Allied authorities ordered the dissolution of all organizations in Germany, including sports and football clubs. The former membership of Wacker reorganized as SG Nordhausen in 1946 and this team went on to become the football department of the sports club BSG Motor Nordhausen in 1949. The club played briefly as KWU/Lok Nordhausen after a merger with an industrial club. From 1951 on the team played as BSG Motor Nordhausen-West in second tier East German football. Motor enjoyed some modest success in the early 80s but then slipped and was relegated to the third division Bezirkliga Erfurt in 1989.

After German reunification in 1990 the football department separated from the sports club to form FSV Wacker 90. The newly independent team took up play in the NOFV-Oberliga Süd (III) in the 1991–92 season and played at that level for seven years, interrupted by three seasons in the Regionalliga Nordost (III) from 1995 to 1998. During the 1990s the club made three appearances in the DFB-Pokal, in 1992–93, 1996–97 and 1997–98 but was knocked out in the first round at each occasion. After relegation back to the NOFV-Oberliga Süd (IV) in 1998 the club slowly declined.  Financial problems drove the club further down to the Landesliga Thüringen (V) in 2000–01 before they finally landed in the Landesklasse Thuringen-Ost (VI) in 2002.

After a decade of lower league play the club won the Thüringenliga in 2011–12 and the NOFV-Oberliga Süd the season after to make a return to the Regionalliga Nordost where it plays today.

Stadium
FSV plays its home matches in the Albert-Kuntz-Sportpark which has a capacity of 8,000 (~1,000 seats) spectators.

Current squad

Honors
The club's honours:
 NOFV-Oberliga Süd
 Champions: 1995, 2013
 Thüringenliga
 Champions: 2012, 2015‡
 Landesklasse Thüringen-Ost
 Champions: 2005
 Thuringia Cup
 Winners: 1992, 1996, 1997, 2019
 Runners-up: 1998, 1999, 2017
 ‡ Denotes won by reserve team.

Recent seasons
The recent season-by-season performance of the club:

 With the introduction of the Regionalligas in 1994 and the 3. Liga in 2008 as the new third tier, below the 2. Bundesliga, all leagues below dropped one tier.

References

External links
Official team site
Abseits Guide to German Soccer

Nordhausen, Thuringia
Football clubs in Germany
Football clubs in East Germany
Football clubs in Thuringia
Association football clubs established in 1905
1905 establishments in Germany
Association football clubs established in 1990
1990 establishments in Germany
Works association football clubs in Germany